Petar Teodorović (1771–1831), known as Petar Dobrnjac (Петар Добрњац) was a Serbian Vojvoda in the First Serbian Uprising. He was born in the Požarevac nahija, in the village of Dobrnje, Petrovac. In his youth, he was a hajduk, and later a trader in farm animals.

Role in the Uprising
In 1804, the year of the First Serbian Uprising, he was a Buljubaša, the commander of a četa (company), under Milenko Stojković. In 1805 he took part in the Battle of Ivankovac against Hafiz-paša, after which the Правитељствујушчи совјет awarded him the rank of Bimbaša (a commander of 1000 men) and Vojvoda. On his initiative Serbs came to the idea to fortify themself in the battle of Ivankovac, which was crucial for Serbian victory. After the Battle of Deligrad in 1806 against Ibrahim Bushati, pasha of Scutari, he became one of the most important men in Serbia.

See also
 List of Serbian Revolutionaries

1771 births
1831 deaths
18th-century Serbian people
19th-century Serbian people
People from Petrovac, Serbia
Military personnel from Požarevac
Politicians from Požarevac
Serbian soldiers
People of the First Serbian Uprising